Babu Singh Kushwaha (born 7 May 1966) is an Indian politician in Uttar Pradesh. He was one of Mayawati's most trusted man and a senior member of her cabinet. Now he is the chairman of the Jan Adhikar Party.

Political career

Kushwaha has worked for the Bahujan Samaj Party. He was for years perceived as the closest to Mayawati. He was a member of Uttar Pradesh Legislative Council, and cabinet minister twice. Kushwaha was the second most powerful person in the Bahujan Samaj Party. All changed after the successive murders of two medical officers in Lucknow blew the lid off the giant National Rural Health Mission scam. He had held the portfolio of Family Welfare and Mining Department before resigning.

Kushwaha joined BJP in presence of senior leaders Vinay Katiyar and Surya Pratap Shahi, but his induction resulted in voices of dissent in the party, after which he wrote a letter to the BJP national president Nitin Gadkari requesting him to suspend until membership until proven innocent. Kushwaha formed the political party Jan Adhikar Party.

2022 Uttar Pradesh elections

In the UP election 2022, in a coalition with Bhagidari Parivartan Morcha contested the 2022 Uttar Pradesh Legislative Assembly Elections. Party did not manage to win any seats in the elections and got less than 1% of votes in Uttar Pradesh.

Political journey
Kushwaha belonged to a farming family in Pakhrauli village of Banda district, graduated in 1985. After this, he started his life by putting a dump in Atarra. In April 1988, he came in contact with BSP founder Kanshi Ram. Kanshi Ram called him to Delhi. Kushwaha had gone to Delhi dreaming of trying his political fortune, but Kanshi Ram made him an employee of the BSP office.
 
Even 6 months would not have passed in the BSP office of Delhi that he was promoted and sent to do organization work in Lucknow office.  When there was an alliance between Samajwadi Party  and BSP in 1993, Babu Singh was made District President of Banda. After this, Mayawati called him to Lucknow and entrusted him with the responsibility of telephone operator in the BSP office. In 2003 also, Babu was again sent to the Uttar Pradesh Legislative Council and when the BSP government was formed for the third time, he was made the Minister of Panchayati Raj.
 
In 2007, when BSP came to power with an absolute majority, Kushwaha got important departments like minerals, appointments, cooperatives. When the Department of Family Welfare was formed, this department was also handed over to him.

References

Further reading 

Living people
Bahujan Samaj Party politicians from Uttar Pradesh
Members of the Uttar Pradesh Legislative Council
State cabinet ministers of Uttar Pradesh
1966 births